Howard Safir (born February 24, 1942) is an American law enforcement professional who served as the 39th New York City Police Commissioner from 1996 to 2000 and the 29th New York City Fire Commissioner from 1994 to 1996, under Mayor Rudy Giuliani. Safir currently serves as Chairman of Safir Intelligence and Security (formerly Vigilant Resources International).

Early life and education
After growing up in the Bronx and Long Island, the son of Russian Jewish immigrant parents (his father was a presser in the garment district, his mother a switchboard operator), Howard Safir followed the example of his famous uncle Louis Weiner (who captured infamous bank robber Willie Sutton), and after graduating from college in 1963, decided to become a lawman.

Safir received his B.A. in History and Political Science from Hofstra University in 1963. He attended Harvard University's John F. Kennedy School of Government, receiving certificates in the programs for Senior Managers in Government in 1988 and for National and International Security in 1989.

Career

Safir began his law enforcement career in 1965 as a special agent assigned to the New York office of the Federal Bureau of Narcotics, a forerunner of the Bureau of Narcotics and Dangerous Drugs (BNDD) and eventually, the Drug Enforcement Administration (DEA). Safir advanced through the ranks of the DEA and in 1977 was appointed Assistant Director of the DEA. He moved to the U.S. Marshals Service (USMS) in 1978 where he served as Chief of the Witness Security Division.  In 1984, he was named Associate Director for Operations, of the USMS, a position he held until his retirement from the federal government in 1990.  Safir rejoined government service in 1994 when Mayor Rudy Giuliani asked him to serve as the New York City's 29th Fire Commissioner. When Police Commissioner William J. Bratton left his position in 1996, Giuliani appointed Safir to replace him as New York City's 39th Police Commissioner.

Commissioner Safir implemented a comprehensive Fugitive Strategy and established thirty-nine major anti-drug initiatives throughout the city including the Northern Manhattan Initiative. He created model blocks in each borough to prevent eradicated drug dealing from returning and he introduced closed circuit television to ensure the safety of housing development residents, park visitors and subway riders. Concerned for officer and public safety, Safir expanded firearms training and introduced Firearms Training Simulators. Under his leadership, firearms discharge incidents decreased from 344 in 1995 to 155 in 1999. He developed and implemented Operation Condor, a creative use of personnel resources, that continues to be a centerpiece of current NYPD crime reduction strategy. Safir served four years as Police Commissioner until he announced his resignation and retirement from government service in 2000.

In 1997, Safir appeared on the ABC TV series NYPD Blue, playing himself.

After Safir resigned as Police Commissioner in 2000, he immediately went to work as a consultant to the chief executive of ChoicePoint, Inc. and ultimately ran their Bode Technology Group subsidiary, which they purchased at Safir's urging in April 2001. In February 2007, Safir became CEO of Bode Technology when GlobalOptions Group, Inc. acquired The Bode Technology Group from ChoicePoint in a cash purchase for $12.5 million. Mr. Safir is currently Chairman of Safir Intelligence & Security.

In 2010, Safir allegedly backed his SUV into a pregnant woman who was attempting to cross a street from between parked cars.  According to the woman, she heard a female passenger scream "Are you not looking, there’s someone there." He then drove off. Safir was tracked down through his license plate but no charges were filed. He claimed he was unaware he had struck anyone.

Professional memberships
Safir is a member of the executive committee of the International Association of Chiefs of Police (IACP) and has served as a delegate to INTERPOL, the National Drug Policy Board and the El Paso Intelligence Center Advisory Board.

Awards and honors
Howard Safir has been recognized frequently throughout his career for his outstanding service. In 1996, he was awarded the Ellis Island Medal of Honor.

He was twice awarded the Presidential Meritorious Executive Award. Additionally, he received the U.S. Marshals Service Meritorious Service Award and the Attorney General's Achievement Award, in addition to many other citations and awards.

Safir is a member of the Board of Trustees of The New York City Police Museum. He serves on the Board of Directors of Verint Systems and Lexis Nexis Special Services Inc.

Family life

Safir is married with two children.

Bibliography

References

External links

 

1941 births
Living people
American people of Russian-Jewish descent
Commissioners of the New York City Fire Department
New York City Police Commissioners
Drug Enforcement Administration agents
Hofstra University alumni
Harvard Kennedy School alumni
People from the Bronx
Time (magazine) people
United States Marshals